Mal Waldron Plays Eric Satie is an album by American jazz pianist Mal Waldron playing compositions by Erik Satie recorded in 1983 and released by the Japanese Baybridge label.

Track listing 
All compositions by Erik Satie
 "Désespoir Agréable"   
 "Hermonies"   
 "Essais"   
 "Première Pensée Rose + Croix"   
 "Le Vilain Petit Vaurien"   
 "Three Gymnopédies, No. 1"
Recorded in Tokyo, Japan on December 8, 1983

Personnel 
 Mal Waldron — piano 
 Reggie Workman — bass
 Ed Blackwell — drums

References 

Mal Waldron albums
1984 albums
Media containing Gymnopedies